Barbara Elisabeth van Houten (8 April 1863 – 27 May 1950) was a Dutch painter.

Biography
Houten was born in Groningen and studied at the École du Louvre in Paris before finishing her studies under August Allebé at the Rijksacademie voor Beeldende Kunsten in Amsterdam. She was the niece of Sientje Mesdag-van Houten who gave her advice on her studies.

Besides oil paintings she is also known for etchings and was a member of the short-lived Dutch Etcher's Club (1885-1896). Houten exhibited her work at the Palace of Fine Arts at the 1893 World's Columbian Exposition in Chicago, Illinois.

Her painting Girl in a Chair was included in the 1905 book Women Painters of the World.

Houten died in The Hague.

References

External links

Barbara van Houten on artnet
Barbara van Houten on RKD

1863 births
1950 deaths
Painters from Groningen
Dutch women painters
19th-century Dutch painters
20th-century Dutch painters
19th-century Dutch women artists
20th-century Dutch women artists